The Ministry of Commerce (MC) is a cabinet-level government ministry of Saudi Arabia responsible for both commerce and investment sectors in the kingdom. Its responsibilities include the development and implementation of policies and mechanisms that govern the sectors of commerce and Investment. The current minister is Majid bin Abdullah Al Qasabi who was appointed on 7 May 2016.

History 
In 1954 a Royal decree was issued to establish the Ministry of Commerce to develop and regulate the internal and external commerce. In 2003, through a government reorganization, the Ministry of Commerce and Industry was established. later، In 2016, the Ministry of Commerce and Industry was amended to the Ministry of Commerce and Investment. On 25 February 2020, this ministry was renamed to Ministry of Commerce.

Structure 
The Ministry has several agencies including:

 Deputy Ministry for Consumer Protection
 Deputy Ministry for Industry Affairs
 Deputy Ministry for Foreign Trade
 Deputy Ministry of Internal Trade
 Deputy Ministry for Technical Affairs
 Marketing and Communication Management
 Administrative and Financial Affairs Management
 Information Technology Management
 General Directorate for Strategic Planning and Projects
 Engineering Management

Commercial Attachés Offices 
The Ministry also supervises commercial attachés offices worldwide with the aims of establishing and developing commercial relationships with other countries. In May 2018, Saudi Arabia appointed with Samar Saleh the first woman to be a commercial attaché in Japan.

References 

1954 establishments in Saudi Arabia
Commerce
Saudi